Statistics of the Primera División de México for the 1964–65 season.

Overview

In order to increase the number of team from 14 to 16 for the 1964–65 season, the league made a Promotional Tournament. The top 2 teams would be in Primera Division. The playoff was composed of the lowest team from Primera division and the 2nd-5th teams in the standings from Segunda Division as Cruz Azul had earned automatic promotion. Nacional finished first securing another season in top flight. Veracruz finished in second place, and was promoted to Primera Division.

Cruz Azul (Jasso) was promoted to Primera División.

The season was contested by 16 teams, and Guadalajara won the championship.

Nacional was relegated to Segunda División.

Teams

League standings

Results

References
Mexico - List of final tables (RSSSF)

1964-65
Mex
1964–65 in Mexican football